Canal Livre was a popular news program in Brazil. It was presented by the former police officer and former politician Wallace Souza and was the most popular show in the city of Manaus. Souza's popularity as host of Canal Livre saw him get elected on three occasions to political office.

The show remained on air until 2009 and came to worldwide attention in August 2009 when it was revealed that the presenter had been accused of hiring hitmen to carry out the crimes his show was documenting. Souza was accused of involvement in at least five murders from 2007 to February 2009, relating to the deaths of people who stole cars and dealt drugs. It is thought the murders were commissioned to increase the program's rating even further and to eliminate all opposition.

The format was very similar to the popular SBT's TV show Programa do Ratinho. In 2013 the program returned to the air under the title Programa Livre, transmitted through an affiliate of the SBT in Manaus.

Format 
The program was a variety show with popular content such as music, interviews and humor but was also a news program about crime.

Canal Livre detailed the murders of various criminal figures, with the camera crews regularly arriving on the crime scene before police. It is this which drew suspicion from detectives who investigated the role of the show in these deaths. Souza's role was as a studio presenter preaching about crime and broadcasting what was deemed "exclusive" coverage of crimes.

However one of the things that more even leveraged the success was Gil, a stage entertainer and sfiha seller (who suffered bullying constantly being called as Rogério and subject to homophobic slurs) and their fights with the puppet Galerito. In early of 2016 these scenes showing the fights between Gil vs. Galerito eventually become an Internet meme, mainly in YouTube.

Investigation 
One of the crimes reported on the show involved a reporter walking through a forest to examine a burning corpse, telling viewers: “It smells like a barbecue. It is a man. It has the smell of burning meat. The impression is that it was in the early hours... it was an execution.” Suspicion arose from this when questions were raised about how the reporter knew the time of the murder.

Investigators were disrupted by Souza and some had their lives threatened. Souza, however, denied any complicity in the deaths, describing the allegations as "absurd" and saying he tried to fight corruption and paedophilia among other crimes. Until October 2009, he was not charged with murder because his position as an elected state official granted him parliamentary immunity. But after being expelled from the assembly, he was indicted on multiple charges. Vanessa Lee, the former producer of the program, was arrested in December 2009. Souza hid from the police at first, but later turned himself in. He died of a heart attack in 2010 while awaiting trial.

References 

Brazilian television news shows
2009 in Brazil
Brazilian television series
Amazonas (Brazilian state)
Internet memes
Portuguese-language television shows